The 2003 Heineken Cup Final was the final match of the 2002–03 Heineken Cup, the eighth season of Europe's top club rugby union competition. The match was played on 24 May 2003 at Lansdowne Road in Dublin. The match was contested by Toulouse and Perpignan, both of France. Toulouse became the second team to win the competition more than once, winning the match 22–17.

Match details

See also
2002–03 Heineken Cup

References

Final
2003
Heineken Cup Final
Hein
USA Perpignan matches
Stade Toulousain matches